I Name you Destroyer  is the second album by the band Jucifer released in 2001 through Velocette Records.

Critical reception

Robert Doerschuk for AllMusic described the album as the band "unleashing a mountain of passionate sound with strong punk references as well as several intriguing departures from the style." Patrick Shabe for PopMatters called the album "indie rock for true rockers who love their giant riffs and power chords."

Track listing

Personnel 
Amber Valentine – guitar, vocals
Edgar Livengood – Bass (track 7), drums
Andy Baker – producer, engineering (tracks: 1 to 12, 15)
Bill Doss – engineering (tracks: 13, 14)

References 

2002 albums
Jucifer albums